Metacarpal ligaments may refer to:

 Deep transverse metacarpal ligament
 Superficial transverse metacarpal ligament